Glenea parahumerointerrupta is a species of beetle in the family Cerambycidae. It was described by Stephan von Breuning in 1982.

References

parahumerointerrupta
Beetles described in 1982